Habit Heroes was an interactive exhibit located within Innoventions East at Epcot in Walt Disney World. The health and wellness exhibit, which focused on healthy habits and ways to fight bad habits, soft-opened on February 4, 2012. Habit Heroes initially generated a backlash from experts within the medical community for the way it depicted and personified bad habits as villains, with claims that it body-shamed and stigmatized obese and overweight individuals. Following an outcry from activist groups, Disney closed the attraction indefinitely in late February, just days before its scheduled public opening on March 5, 2012.

After research and consultation with medical experts, the attraction was retooled with a new storyline complete with new characters. It eventually opened to the public on January 18, 2013. Without warning, Disney permanently closed the attraction three years later on January 17, 2016.

Original attraction

Queue
In its early stages before closure, the attraction was initially set in a gymnasium, in which the main headquarters of the organisation (a superhero front on the lookout against bad habits) are held, and led by two of the character hosts Will Powers and Callie Stenics. Participants are explained their mission - to arm themselves with the necessary skills to defeat the 'bad habits' (personified as caricatured villains representing a negative health habit, such as Leadbottom and the Snacker).

Activities
In order, the exhibit featured three activities each respectively circulating around three issues: excessive screen time (taking place in Control Freak's electronic lair), excessive junk foods (featuring The Snacker and Sweet Tooth) and predisposition to inactivity (featuring Leadbottom).

In the first activity following the preshow, participants are led into a cylindrical room (Control Freak's electronic lair), in which the walls are decked with multiple control panels, and the aim of this activity was to sprint from one control panel to another, to switch off the falling televisions. Following the activity, participants are led into a room with an arrangement of cannons (a similar setup to Toy Story Midway Mania!) and participants were to shoot down city scenes constructed from junk foods, with broccoli, carrots and blueberries for ammunition. For the third activity, participants are led into a room with a dancing grid, and participants were encouraged to partake in a physically active dance routine, and likely to get Leadbottom to dance along as well.

After these activities, the final one was a series of screens that were designed to scan participants and determine their state of health, as well as provide suggestions on how to improve their lifestyle. They were never used in their operational state.

Online Game
In conjunction with the attraction, an interactive game of the same name and premise was released. There were two versions - one being the online roleplayer game, in which players can register, create their avatar, and take on a wider range of villains to conquer and defeat, as corresponding to their negative health habits:

The mobile online version of the game also consisted of miniature activities, such as a timer used to calculate the correct time spent for brushing teeth, which were supposedly designed to bring these skills to the real world.

Controversy and Feedback
On February 22, 2012, the exhibit came under fire by physicians, body image advocates, fat acceptance activists, psychologists, and some parents,
 for many reasons including the reinforcement of demeaning stereotypes on certain guests for encouraging bullying against overweight or children who are predisposed to obesity and for fear that the exhibit could trigger the establishment of negative health habits (eating disorders to lose weight, for instance) and suicide.

Critics also contended that the exhibit might defeat its intended purpose of educating the public concerning health habits. In addition, forums and blogs suggested that the exhibit was inferior to Epcot's previous success, Wonders of Life.

Various blogs have documented the event, including Freedhoff's Weighty Matters blog, in which he labels the attraction as "horrifying" and "demonstrating a complete lack of understanding"
. Quickly, the issue spread to social networking circles and even on national news headlines

. Within two days of the exhibit's initial opening, Disney decided to close it for retooling, prior to its official March 3 opening date.
 One writer expressed disturbance that "Disney and Florida Blue felt the need to cave under the loud and misguided views of people who clearly didn't understand the exhibit," and lauded the exhibit's effectiveness in conveying its message.

Revamped attraction
During the retooling, Imagineers at Disney consulted various national experts in children's health, weight and nutrition, including an obesity expert from Stanford University and a nutritional scientist from Cornell University. They sought assistance in retooling and recreating the attraction from scratch following the backlash. Characters Will Powers and Callie Stenics, as well as the notorious villains, have been replaced in favor of four more heroes - Director Jin and three agents, Agent Dynamo, representing physical activity, Agent Quench, representing hydration, and Agent Fuel, representing healthy eating and nutrition. The villains have been replaced with more pestilent opponents - Blocker-Bots (opponents that hide healthy food choices), Sappers (sentient boulders that prevent people undertaking physical activity) and Scorchers (sentient flames that can dehydrate people without their knowledge).

Activities
Although retaining the identical floorplan of the previous attraction, the improved attraction now has three activities: one incorporating exactly the same dance grid, this time, encouraging guests to practice their 'power moves' against the pestilent opponents. Next, retaining the same cannons, participants defend a city by shooting at the same opponents. In the final activity, with the cylindrical room and multiple control panels, participants defend the world targeting the same opponents as before.

The attraction is notable for its use of cast-member interaction and mediation to the guests participating in it, and afterwards, there is an opportunity for guests to receive a mission in response to their chosen health habit to improve on. Also notable is the mobile application which encourages users to improve their chosen health habit via various activities (such as a pedometer for walking exercises).

Response
Since the retooling, the attraction was cited by the SunSentinel as a "...kinder, more sensitive attraction" compared with earlier on, and despite mixed reviews, the improved attraction has been well received by guests alike. Even Freedhoff has written a follow-up blog post, praising the improvements

See also
Innoventions (Epcot)
Wonders of Life, a pavilion containing a set of similarly themed attractions (now closed)

References